Sir Viqar ul-Umara, Iqtidar ul-Mulk, Iqbal ud-Dowla, Secundar Jung, Nawab Muhammad Fazl-ud-din Khan Bahadur  (13 August 1856 – 15 February 1902), was the Prime Minister of Hyderabad from 1893 to 1901, and also served as the Amir e Paigah from 1881 to 1902.

The town of Vikarabad and Village is named after him.

Early life and ancestry
Viqar-ul-Umra was born as Muhammad Fazluddin Khan on 13 August 1856 to Rashiduddin Khan and Hashmatunnisa Begum. Viqar-ul-Umra's maternal grandmother was Bashirunnisa Begum, a daughter of Nizam Ali Khan Nizam of Hyderabad and Berar.

Viqar-ul-Umra was a member of the Paigah family. The family was hierarchically second to the Nizam of Hyderabad. The family members were staunch loyalists of the Nizam. The family descends from the Rashidun caliph Umar. One of the family's ancestor is the Sufi saint Fariduddin Ganjshakar. Another ancestor Muhammad Abu’l Khair Khan was a mansabdar during Mughal emperor Aurangzeb's reign.

Tenure as prime minister

During his years as prime minister, he made valuable contributions in the field of education. The education department, the engineering school, the law classes, the legislative Council and the Asafia Library were opened under his prime-ministership.

He was the fifth Amir of a noble family, the Paigahs, and was the maternal grandson of Asaf Jah III.

Sir Muhammad Fazl ud-din built the magnificent palace like Falaknuma Palace as his residence, which took 9 years to build and was completed in 1893.

He also built the magnificent Paigah Palace in the European style of architecture, after he gave the Falaknuma palace to Mahbub Ali Khan, Asaf Jah VI, where he spent his life. He built Vikhar Manzil, near Hussain Sagar lake.

Architecture
Viqar-ul-Umra commissioned the Spanish Mosque (original name: Jama Masjid Aiwan-e-Begumpet) at Begumpet, Hyderabad in 1887. He started its construction after getting inspired by Spanish architecture during one of his trips to Spain. It is built in the Moorish architecture style and has calligraphy, horseshoe arches and influences of Roman architecture.

Viqar-ul-Umra constructed the Falaknuma Palace in 1893. Later Nizam Mahbub Ali Khan bought this palace. This palace was built with a blend of Italian and Tudor architecture and the ceiling is adorned with frescos. It also has the world's largest dining wall in which chairs made of rosewood are present. Currently, it is a hotel, leased to Taj Hotels. Notable dignitaries to stay in this palace include Czar Nicholas II, George V, Queen Mary, Narendra Modi and Ivanka Trump.

After Nizam bought the Falaknuma Palace, Viqar-ul-Umra built the Paigah Palace (originally known as Aiwan-e-Viqar) for himself. The Zenana Mahal in it was built with a blend of Neo Gothic, Indo-Saracenic and Mughal architecture. A part of the palace houses the U.S. consulate and a part of it is inhabited by his descendants. By , he built scores of monuments, public buildings, Dams, water reservoirs, artificial lakes, and about 21 palaces and mansions in the state of Hyderabad including the palace of Paigah Palace also known as Aiwan-e-Begumpet.

Viqar-ul-Umra founded the city of Vikarabad in present-day Telangana state, India. This town is named after him. In this beautiful town with a mini hill station of Ananthgiri hills, he constructed the Sultan Manzil for his son Nawab Sultan-Ul-Mulk, post-office, police station, Hospital, Sanitarium, Vikarabad Bazar, Kotpally dam, Vikarabad lake and a hunting lodges imported from London in 1882.

Personal life
In , Viqar-ul-Umra married Jahanderunnisa Begum. She was the fourth daughter of Nizam Afzal ad-Dawlah, Asaf Jah V Tahniyath Ali Khan]] and a sister of Nizam Mahboob Ali Khan. After Nawab Viqar-ul-Umra Bahadur was knighted, she took the title Lady Viqar-ul-Umra. Their son Sultan-ul-Mulk was born on 3 November 1875. He later became the Amir-i-Paigah-Viqar-ul-Umra (Amir-i-Paigah of Viqar-ul-Umra branch). They also had a daughter – Liaqatunnisa Begum.

In 1878, Viqar-ul-Umra married Munirunnisa Begum, the daughter of Nawab Hamza Ali Khan Bahadur. Their son Waliuddin Khan was born on 13 March 1880. He later served as the Prime Minister of Hyderabad. They also had a daughter – Taharaqunnisa Begum.

Although Viqar-ul-Umra's previous marriages were arranged, he fell in love with Dr. Gulbai Viccajee, a Hyderabadi physician. They first met at Mumbai. In 1900, they married. As she was a Zoroastrian by faith (colloquially known as Parsi), she converted to Islam to marry him. She took the name Nur Jahan Begum. After marriage, she left her medical profession and lived in purdah at Vikhar Manzil.

Viqar-ul-Umra died while hunting at Yalghadap - Khanapur (in present-day Nizamabad district in Telangana) on 15 February 1902. He is buried at the Paigah Tombs.

Polo
Viqar-ul-Umra was an avid player of polo. He discovered the sport during a tour to Europe and later brought it to Hyderabad. He went on to popularise the sport amongst the nobles of the state. He also constructed polo grounds in the state and organized polo tournaments for the royal families.

References

External links
 Feature on a palace he built
 The Hindu feature on Paigah tombs

Hyderabad State
1856 births
1902 deaths
Knights Commander of the Order of the Indian Empire
Indian knights
Recipients of the Kaisar-i-Hind Medal
Prime Ministers of Hyderabad State